Peard Bay is a bay in the Chukchi Sea, in Alaska's North Slope. This bay lies just a few miles northeast of Wainwright. It was named by Frederick William Beechey in 1826, after one of his officers.

Peard Bay is relatively small and it is limited by Point Franklin on its western side.

Peard Bay Airport (WQJ) is close to the bay area.

In several documents this bay is named erroneously as "Pearl Bay".

Kugrua Bay is a smaller bay to the southeast, accessible through an opening in the shoreline of Peard Bay.

History
The name Peard Bay used to design a much wider area in the past, comprised between Seahorse Islands and Point Barrow.

Notes

References

External links
Peard Bay Airport

Bays of Alaska
Bodies of water of North Slope Borough, Alaska
Bays of the Chukchi Sea